Deer Island Light is a lighthouse in Boston Harbor, Boston, Massachusetts.

The location first had a stone beacon in 1832. The first light, a sparkplug type light, was lit in 1890. It cost about $50,000. It included a three-story dwelling, a veranda with boat davits, and a circular parapet. The water supply was a cistern in the base of the structure. A spiral staircase ran from the cellar to the top floor. It had a fixed white light, which was changed to flashing red every thirty seconds and then to the present alternating red and white flashes. The old light gradually deteriorated and was replaced in 1982 by a white fiberglass tower. The white tower raised complaints because it blended in with the background and was hard to see, so the Coast Guard moved it to Great Point Light, Nantucket, as a temporary replacement when that tower was destroyed by a storm in March 1984. A brown fiberglass tower was installed immediately thereafter. While the Spark plug light was interesting, it was much more expensive to maintain than the fiberglass structure. Imported from England, the pole light was the first of its kind in the United States.

The new light uses LED technology and sits on a steel skeletal tower, atop four piles. Like other lights in Boston Harbor, the automatic fog signal has been replaced by a Mariner Radio Activated Sound Signal (MRASS) which can be activated by nearby mariners by tuning their marine VHF radio to channel 83A (157.17 5Mhz) and keying the transmitter five times consecutively.

Gallery

References

Lighthouses completed in 1890
Lighthouses completed in 1984
Boston Harbor
Lighthouses in Boston
1890 establishments in Massachusetts